Saud Zidan (born 6 November 1999) is a Saudi Arabian professional footballer who plays as a midfielder for Al-Fayha.

Career
Saud Zidan signed his first professional, three-year, contract with Al-Nassr on 6 December 2018. On 1 September 2019, Saud Zidan joined Al-Jabalain on loan from Al-Nassr. On 11 October 2020, Saud Zidan joined Abha on loan from Al-Nassr. On 8 July 2021, Zidan joined Al-Hazem on a permanent deal. On 3 July 2022, Zidan joined Al-Fayha on a three-year deal following Al-Hazem's relegation.

References

External links 
 

1999 births
Living people
Saudi Arabian footballers
Saudi Arabia youth international footballers
Al Nassr FC players
Al-Jabalain FC players
Abha Club players
Al-Hazem F.C. players
Al-Fayha FC players
Saudi Professional League players
Saudi First Division League players
Association football midfielders